107 Avenue is a major arterial road in west-central Edmonton, Alberta, Canada. It serves Edmonton's west side industrial district, neighbourhoods of the former Town of Jasper Place (amalgamated with Edmonton in 1964), the multicultural area north of Downtown Edmonton, Commonwealth Stadium, and adjacent park & ride transit centre. The portion between 95 and 116 Streets has been dubbed "Avenue of Nations", as immigrants from around the world live in this area, including African Nations, Arabic Nations, Cambodia, China, First Nations, Italy, Japan, Latin American, Poland, Ukraine, and Vietnam. Also, Chinatown lies just south of Avenue of Nations. 107 Avenue changes names at 101 Street to 107A Avenue. 107A Avenue changes names at 92 Street to Stadium Road. Stadium Road changes names at 112 Avenue to 86 Street (Fort Road).

Neighbourhoods

List of neighbourhoods 107 Avenue runs through, in order from west to east.
Britannia Youngstown
Mayfield
High Park
Canora
Grovenor
McQueen
North Glenora
Glenora
Westmount
Queen Mary Park
Central McDougall
McCauley
Cromdale

Major intersections
This is a list of major intersections, starting at the west end of 107 Avenue.

See also 

 List of avenues in Edmonton
 Transportation in Edmonton

References

Roads in Edmonton